Hsiao Sa (Xiao Sa) (born March 4, 1953) is the pen name of Hsiao Ching-yu/Hsiao Ch’ing-yü, a Taiwanese educator and writer.

Hsiao Sa's family was from Nanjing and went to Taiwan where she was born. She studied at the Girl's Teacher Institute and then taught primary school in Taipei. Her first collection of stories was published when she was 17. Hsiao married director Chang Yi; the couple divorced in 1986.

Her 1981 book Xiafei zhi jia (A family from Xiafei) was made into a 1985 film Wo zhe yang guo le yi sheng (The life of Guimei). Her novella Wo er Hansheng was also made into a movie.

Her work has received a number of literary awards, as well as a Golden Horse Award for script writing.

Selected works 
  (Night scenes in daylight), short stories (1977)
  (1980)
  (My son Hansheng), novella (1981)
  (The youth Ahxin), novel (1984)
  (Diaries of homecoming), novel (1987)

References

External links 
 

1953 births
Living people
Taiwanese women novelists
International Writing Program alumni
Taiwanese schoolteachers